Jeffrey O'Kelly is an Irish actor and writer. He is the creator of the animated television series Doctor Snuggles.

Jeffrey O'Kelly was born in Doire, Ireland.

In 2011, O'Kelly was reported to be working on Blarneyland, a live action film with SFX leprechauns and faeries.

Selected works 
 The Thin Red Line (actor)
 Doctor Snuggles (1979) (creator)
 Tusk (1980) (writer)
 The Story of O 2 (1984) (writer)

References

External links 
 Bibliography at doctorsnuggles.com
 

Irish television writers
Male television writers
Living people
Irish male writers
People from Derry (city)
1953 births